Assabeel (The Path in English) is an Arabic weekly newspaper in Amman, Jordan. The paper was described by a leaked US cable as an Islamist publication.

History
Assabeel was launched by the Muslim Brotherhood members in Jordan in 1993. Editor-in-chief of the paper is Atef Al Joulani. The paper was the continuation of the Brotherhood's official publication Al Ribat. The 2002 circulation of the paper was reported by Saud Abu Mahfuz, general manager of the weekly, to be 17,000. The paper became daily in 2009.

See also
List of newspapers in Jordan

References

1993 establishments in Jordan
Mass media in Amman
Newspapers established in 1993
Newspapers published in Jordan
Weekly newspapers